The American Philatelic Society Hall of Fame award honors deceased philatelists who have contributed significantly to the field of national and/or international philately.

History

The APS Hall of Fame award was founded at the 1940 American Philatelic Society Convention. The award is intended to honor those deceased philatelists who have made significant contributions during their lifetime to the field of philately.

The award is not to be confused with the society's Luff Award which is presented to outstanding philatelists who are alive at the time of award.

Requirements
Requirements for the APS Hall of Fame are:
 only deceased collectors may be considered for nomination
 those nominated must have made "outstanding contributions to the advancement of national or international philately."

Recipients
Philatelists who have received the APS Hall of Fame award are listed below. Note that some years have no nominees selected.

External links
APS Hall of Fame
Alphabetical listing

Philatelic awards
Phil
Awards established in 1940